Lev Nikolayevich Gumilev (also Gumilyov; ; 1 October 1912 – 15 June 1992) was a Soviet historian, ethnologist, anthropologist and translator. He had a reputation for his highly unorthodox theories of ethnogenesis and historiosophy. He was an exponent of Eurasianism.

Life
Gumilev's parents, the prominent poets Nikolai Gumilev and Anna Akhmatova, divorced when he was 7 years old and his father was executed by the Cheka when he was just 9. Gumilev spent much of his adulthood, from 1938 until 1956, in Soviet labor camps. He was arrested by the NKVD in 1935 and released, but rearrested and sentenced to five years in 1938. Osip Mandelstam's "Stalin Epigram" is said to have played a role in his arrest.  After release, he joined the Red Army and took part in the Battle of Berlin of 1945. However, he was arrested again in 1949 and sentenced to ten years in prison camps. Aiming to secure his freedom, Akhmatova published a dithyramb to Joseph Stalin, which did not help to release Gumilev, although it possibly prevented her own imprisonment. The Soviet secret police had already prepared an order for her arrest, but Stalin decided not to sign it. Relations between Gumilev and his mother became strained, as he blamed her for not helping him enough. She described her feelings about her son's arrest and the period of political repressions in Requiem (published in 1963).

After Stalin's death in 1953, Gumilev joined the Hermitage Museum, whose director, Mikhail Artamonov, he would accept as his mentor. Under Artamonov's guidance, he became interested in Khazar studies and in steppe peoples in general. In the 1950s and 1960s, he participated in several expeditions to the Volga Delta and to the North Caucasus. He proposed an archeological site for Samandar as well as the theory of the Caspian transgression in collaboration with geologist Alexander Aleksin as one of the reasons for Khazar decline. In 1960, he started delivering lectures at Leningrad University. Two years later, he defended his doctoral thesis on ancient Turks. From the 1960s, he worked in the Geography Institute, where he would defend another doctoral thesis, this time in geography.

Although the official Soviet authorities rejected his ideas and banned most of his monographs from being published, Gumilev came to attract much publicity, especially in the Perestroika years of 1985–1991. As an indication of his popularity, the Kazakh president Nursultan Nazarbayev ordered the L. N. Gumilev Eurasian National University (Евразийский Национальный университет имени Л. Н. Гумилёва, founded in 1996) to be erected just opposite his own palace on the central square of the new Kazakh capital, Astana.

Ideas
Gumilev attempted to explain the waves of nomadic migration that rocked the great steppe of Eurasia for centuries by geographical factors such as annual variations in solar radiation, which determine the area of grasslands that could be used for grazing livestock. According to this idea, when the steppe areas shrank drastically, the nomads of Central Asia began moving to the fertile pastures of Europe or China.

To describe the genesis and evolution of ethnic groups, Gumilev introduced the concept of "passionarity" (пассионарность), meaning the level of activity to expand typical for an ethnic group, and especially for their leaders, at a given moment in time. He argued that every ethnic group passes through the same stages of birth, development, climas, inertia, convolution and memorial. It is during the "acmatic" phases, when the national passionarity reaches its maximum heat, that the great conquests are made. Gumilev described the current state of Europe as deep inertia, or "introduction to obscuration", to use his own words. The passionarity of the Arabic world, in contrast, is still high, according to him.

Drawing inspiration from the works of Konstantin Leontyev and Nikolay Danilevsky, Gumilev regarded Russians as a "super-ethnos" kindred to Turkic-Mongol peoples of the Eurasian steppe. The periods in which Russia has been said to conflict with the steppe peoples were reinterpreted  by Gumilev as the periods of consolidation of Russian power with that of steppe to oppose destructive influences from Catholic Europe, that posed a potential threat to integrity of Russian.

In accordance with his pan-Asiatic theories, he supported the national movements of Tatars, Kazakhs and other Turkic peoples, in addition to those of the Mongols and other East Asians. Unsurprisingly, Gumilev's teachings have enjoyed immense popularity in Central Asian countries. In Kazan, for example, a monument to him was erected in August 2005.

The historian Mark Bassin stated that Gumilev's theories are scientifically unproven and problematic but that they have a significant impact in a range of Soviet and post-Soviet contexts. Several researchers, such as Vadim Rossman, John Klier, Victor Yasmann, Victor Schnirelmann and Mikhail Tripolsky describe Gumilev's views as anti-Semitic. According to those authors, Gumilev did not extend this ethnological ecumenism to the medieval Jews, whom he regarded as a parasitic, international urban class that had dominated the Khazars and subjected the early East Slavs to the "Khazar Yoke". The last phrase was adapted by him from the traditional term "Tatar Yoke" for the Mongol domination of medieval Russia, a term that Gumilev rejected since he did not regard the Mongol conquest as a necessarily-negative event.

In particular, he asserted that the Radhanites had been instrumental in the exploitation of East Slavic people and had exerted undue influence on the sociopolitical and economic landscape of the early Middle Ages. Gumilev maintained that the Jewish culture was by nature mercantile and existed outside and in opposition to its environment. According to that view, Jews share a specific way of thinking, and this is associated with the moral norms of Judaism. According to Gumilev, the medieval Jews also did not bear arms themselves but waged wars by proxies or mercenaries.

Personal life 
Gumilev identified himself as an Orthodox Christian.

Gumilev married in 1967, the year after his mother died.

Works
The Hsiung-nu (1960)
Ancient Turks (1964)

The Hsiung-nu in China (1974)
Ethnogenesis and the Biosphere of Earth (1978)
Ancient Rus and the Great Steppe (1989)
An End and a New Beginning (1989)
From Rus to Russia (1992)

See also
 Eurasianism

References

External links

Gumilevica: All about Gumilev (Biography, Bibliography, Works & Maps)
Electronically available publications by Lev Gumilev (Russian)
Lev Gumilev, Ethnogenesis and Eurasianism by Alexander Sergeevich Titov

1912 births
1992 deaths
Writers from Saint Petersburg
People from Sankt-Peterburgsky Uyezd
Soviet historians
Russian orientalists
Khazar studies
Russian ethnologists
Russian geographers
Russian anthropologists
Sharashka inmates
National mysticism
Eurasianism
Saint Petersburg State University alumni
Academic staff of High Courses for Scriptwriters and Film Directors
Russian people of Tatar descent
Burials at Nikolskoe Cemetery
20th-century anthropologists
20th-century geographers
Soviet military personnel of World War II
Russian Turkologists